James Lockhart (February 13, 1806 – September 7, 1857) was an American lawyer and politician who served one term politician as a United States representative from Indiana from 1851 to 1853, then again in 1857.

Biography 
He was born in Auburn, New York where he attended the public schools. Later, he moved to Ithaca, New York about 1826 and operated a woolen mill. He moved to Indiana in 1832 and studied law. He was admitted to the bar in 1832 and commenced practice in Evansville, Indiana in 1834.

Lockhart was the city clerk in 1836 and 1837 and the prosecuting attorney of Vanderburg County, Indiana 1841–1845. He served as judge of the fourth judicial district from 1846 until 1851, when he resigned.  He was a delegate to the Indiana constitutional convention in 1850.

Congress 
Lockhart was elected as a Democrat to the Thirty-second Congress (March 4, 1851 – March 3, 1853) but was not a candidate for reelection in 1852 to the Thirty-third Congress.

Later career and death 
After leaving Congress, he resumed the practice of his profession in Evansville, Indiana. He was appointed by President Franklin Pierce superintendent of construction of the marine hospital at Evansville in 1853.

He was elected to the Thirty-fifth Congress and served from March 4, 1857, until his death in Evansville, Indiana on September 7, 1857. He was buried in Oak Hill Cemetery.

See also
List of United States Congress members who died in office (1790–1899)

References

1806 births
1857 deaths
Politicians from Auburn, New York
Politicians from Evansville, Indiana
Democratic Party members of the United States House of Representatives from Indiana
Indiana state court judges
19th-century American politicians
19th-century American judges